WKCN (99.3 FM), known as "Kissin 99.3", is a radio station licensed to Fort Benning South/Columbus, and serving the greater Columbus, Georgia, area.  Its studios are co-located with four other sister stations on Wynnton Road in Columbus east of downtown, and its transmitter is located near Fort Mitchell, Alabama.

Programming
Kissin 99.3 began broadcasting country music in 1992, and remains a country music radio station today.  Current on-air personalities include Bear O'Brian (Wade Collier), Morgan in the Midday, Brian Thomas in the Afternoon, and Dave Arwood at Night, Monday through Friday.  WKCN-FM also carries American Country Countdown with Kix Brooks on Sunday nights.

Ownership
In December 2002, McClure Broadcasting, Inc., (Chuck McClure Jr., president) reached an agreement to sell this station to Archway Broadcasting Group (Al Vicente, president/CEO). This was part of a four-station deal, along with WRLD-FM, WRCG, and WCGQ, for a reported combined sale price of $15 million. At the time of the sale, WKCN carried a country music format.

On July 31, 2008, local investment group PMB Broadcasting LLC (headed up by Jim Martin) purchased this station along with Columbus-area sister stations WRCG-AM, WRLD-FM and WCGQ-FM from Archway Broadcasting Group LLC for a reported sale price of $7.2 million. At the time of the sale, the station carried and continues to carry a country music format.  PMB Broadcasting LLC has since added WLTC to its list of stations owned.

Translators
WKCN airs its HD2 and HD3 formats on the following translators:

References

External links
WKCN official website

KCN
Country radio stations in the United States
Radio stations established in 1992